Mikhail Kaaleste (born Mihail Stolär; 20 August 1931 – 5 May 2018) is an Estonian sprint canoeist who competed in 1950s. He won a silver medal in the K-2 1000 m event at the 1956 Summer Olympics in Melbourne.

Kaaleste changed his last name in 1940 from Stolär. Originally going into cross-country skiing, he was changed to sprint canoeing by his coaches at Dynamo Sports Club. After winning a silver medal in Melbourne, Kaaleste won two bronze medals at the 1958 ICF Canoe Sprint World Championships in Prague (K-2 1000 m, K-4 1000 m). He also won several medals in the Soviet Union in cross-country skiing in the 1950s.

In 1964, he became coach for the Dynamo Leningrad biathlon and cross-country skiing. Kaaleste's wife, Anna, finished ninth in the 10 km cross-country skiing event at the 1956 Winter Olympics in Cortina d'Ampezzo.

References

External links

Sports-reference.com profile

1931 births
2018 deaths
Canoeists at the 1956 Summer Olympics
Estonian male canoeists
Estonian male cross-country skiers
Olympic canoeists of the Soviet Union
Olympic silver medalists for the Soviet Union
Soviet male canoeists
Soviet male cross-country skiers
Olympic medalists in canoeing
ICF Canoe Sprint World Championships medalists in kayak
Medalists at the 1956 Summer Olympics
Lesgaft National State University of Physical Education, Sport and Health alumni
20th-century Estonian people